Burchell is a surname and more rarely a given name. It may refer to:

People

Surname
 Beau Burchell (born 1978), American musician and record producer
 Charles Jost Burchell (1876–1967), Canadian diplomat
 David Godwin Burchell (1924–2009), South Australian businessman, recreational scuba diver and Australian rules football administrator
 Francis Burchell (1874–1947), English cricketer 
 Fred Burchell (baseball) (1879–1951), American baseball pitcher
 Fred Burchell (ice hockey) (1931–1998), Canadian ice hockey player
 Hannah Burchell (born 1995), Australian rules footballer
 Jamie Burchell (born 1979), British basketball player
 Joe Burchell (1873–1932), English football manager
 Reginald Burchell (1883–1955), Australian politician
 Remona Burchell (born 1991), Jamaican sprinter
 Thomas Burchell (1799–1846), Baptist missionary and slavery abolitionist in Jamaica
 Thomas Burchell (cricketer) (1875–1951), English cricketer
 William John Burchell (1781–1863), English explorer and naturalist

Pen name
 Mary Burchell, pen name of romance novelist Ida Cook (1904–1986)

Given name
 Burchell Whiteman (born 1938), Jamaican politician

Fictional characters
 Mr. Burchell, in Oliver Goldsmith's novel The Vicar of Wakefield.
 Burchell Clemens, alter ego of Marvel Comics villain Cottonmouth

See also
Burchell Lake, Ontario, Canada, a ghost town
Species named for William John Burchell:
Burchell's coucal
Burchell's courser
Burchell's starling
Burchell's redfin
Burchell's sandgrouse
Burchell's zebra